... Legh (fl. 1512) was an English politician.

He was a Member (MP) of the Parliament of England for Plymouth in 1512.

References

15th-century births
16th-century deaths
Members of the Parliament of England for Plymouth
English MPs 1512–1514